Genaro Rubén Carrió (16 February 1922 - 17 October 1997) was an Argentinian jurist and translator. He served as President of the Supreme Court of Argentina between 1983 and 1985 designated by president Raúl Alfonsín.

He graduated at Law at the National University of La Plata in 1944. The he studied at the Dedman School of Law in Dallas, Texas focused in the Common law.

He worked as a translator to Spanish language of American jurists like Alf Ross and H. L. A. Hart.

References

1922 births
1997 deaths
20th-century Argentine judges
Argentine translators
National University of La Plata alumni
Supreme Court of Argentina justices
English–Spanish translators
20th-century translators
Analytic philosophers
Philosophers of law